The Women's relay competition of the Beijing 2022 Olympics was held on 16 February, at the National Biathlon Centre, in the Zhangjiakou cluster of competition venues,  north of Beijing, at an elevation of . Linn Persson, Mona Brorsson, Hanna Öberg, and Elvira Öberg of Sweden won the event, with the Russian Olympic Committee winning the silver medal, and Germany bronze. This was the first Olympic gold in women's relay for Sweden.

Summary
The defending champions are Belarus, and the 2018 silver and bronze medalists were Sweden and France, respectively. There were four women's relays in the 2021–22 Biathlon World Cup before the Olympics; two were won by France, and one by Sweden and Norway each. Norway are also the 2021 World Champion with Germany and Ukraine as silver and bronze medalists. 

Germany, Sweden, and Italy finished the first leg together, with an advantage of about 15-20 seconds over a large group of competitors, which included all the top teams. There were no penalty loops in the first leg. In the second leg, France and Belarus run one penalty loop each, and Norway run two, and these teams dropped behind. At the second exchange the Russian Olympic Committee were leading, 11 seconds ahead of Italy, 27 seconds ahead of Sweden, and 46 seconds ahead of Germany. Norway were almost two minutes behind, as well as the number of other teams. On the second shooting of the third leg, Svetlana Mironova had to run a penalty loop. She remained in the leading group, but lost the advantage she developed on the leg. At the thirst interchange, Sweden were leading, with Italy 7 seconds behind, the Russian Olympic committee 13 seconds, Germany 37 seconds, and Norway and France one minute 15 seconds behind. In leg 4, France got a penalty loop at the second shooting and dropped out of medal contention. After the last shooting, Sweden were leading with the Russian Olympic Committee 25 seconds, Germany 35 seconds, and Norway 54 seconds behind. They finished in the same order.

Qualification

Results
The race was started at 15:45.

References

Biathlon at the 2022 Winter Olympics
Women's biathlon at the 2022 Winter Olympics